Hanna is an American action drama streaming television series, based on the 2011 film of the same name, for Amazon Prime Video. The series was created and written by David Farr and stars Esme Creed-Miles and Mireille Enos. The first episode was made available on Amazon Prime Video as a time-limited preview on February 3, 2019. The full eight-episode first season was released on March 29, 2019, and the second season was released on July 3, 2020. In July 2020, the series was renewed for a third and final season. It premiered on November 24, 2021.

Premise
Hanna is a 15-year-old girl living with Erik, the only man she has ever known as her father, in a remote part of a forest in Poland. Erik once recruited pregnant women into a CIA program, code name UTRAX, where the children's DNA was enhanced in order to create super-soldiers. When Erik falls in love with Johanna, Hanna's mother, he rescues baby Hanna and they flee. The CIA then orders their on-site agent, Marissa, to shut down the project and eliminate all the babies.

Cast and characters

Main
Esme Creed-Miles as Hanna, a girl who was part of the original UTRAX program as an infant but was rescued by Erik Heller, who raised and trained her on his own
Mireille Enos as Marissa Wiegler, the CIA operative put in charge of the original UTRAX program, who turns from a foe to an ally and mother figure to Hanna
Joel Kinnaman as Erik Heller (season 1; guest, season 3), a former CIA operative who worked for UTRAX but rescued Hanna after falling in love with her mother
Noah Taylor as Dr. Roland Kunek (season 1), a scientist who designed the regimen for the young agents in the second UTRAX program
Dermot Mulroney as John Carmichael (seasons 2–3), the CIA operative at the helm of both UTRAX programs
Ray Liotta as Gordon Evans / The Chairman (season 3), the head of Pioneer and the man pulling the strings behind UTRAX

Recurring

CIA
Khalid Abdalla as Jerome Sawyer (season 1)
Justin Salinger as Carl Meisner (seasons 1, 3)
Andy Nyman as Jacobs (season 1)
Anthony Welsh as Leo Garner (season 2), a supervisor at The Meadows who is responsible for indoctrinating the trainees
Cherrelle Skeete as Terri Miller (seasons 2–3), a new transfer who is in charge of using social media interaction to cultivate trainees at The Meadows
Katie Clarkson Hill as Joanne McCoy (season 2), a CIA officer who works under Carmichael at The Meadows
Chloe Pirrie as Brianna Stapleton (season 3), the new CIA supervisor at The Meadows, and The Chairman's primary lieutenant
Gabriel Akuwudike as Max Kaplan (season 3), a CIA programmer who worked on programming for Pioneer in the early days whom Marissa tracks down

England
Rhianne Barreto as Sophie (season 1), Hanna's new friend whose family Hanna meets in Morocco

France
Adam Bessa as Abbas Nazir (season 3), Hanna's first target upon graduating from The Meadows, whom Hanna becomes attracted to

Germany
Stefan Rudolf as Rudi (season 1)
Katharina Heyer as Elsa (season 1)
Peter Ferdinando as Lucas (season 1)
Benno Fürmann as Dieter (season 1)

Poland
Joanna Kulig as Johanna Petrescu (season 1; guest, season 3), Hanna's mother

UTRAX
Yasmin Monet Prince as Girl 249 / Clara Mahan (seasons 1–2), a trainee at the UTRAX facility who is rescued and escapes with Hanna
Áine Rose Daly as Girl 242 / Sandy Phillips, a trainee at the UTRAX facility who is transferred to the Meadows
Gianna Kiehl as Jules Allen (seasons 2–3), a trainee at the Meadows facility whom Sandy befriends

Guest

CIA and UTRAX
 Michelle Duncan as False Marissa (season 1, 3)
 Varada Sethu as CIA Analyst McArthur (season 1)
 Andrea Deck as Carlsson (season 1)
 Emma D'Arcy as Sonia Richter (season 2), a new addition to Marissa's Paris office, but she is actually working for Carmichael

Austria
 Wiebke Frost as Lena Behr (season 3), a woman who owns a remote cabin the Austrian countryside, who takes in and hides Abbas Nazir  
 Léann Hamon as Nadiya (season 3), Abbas Nazir's daughter

England
 Lyndsey Marshal as Rachel (season 1), Sophie's mother
 Phaldut Sharma as Tom (season 1), Sophie's father

Germany
 Ursula Werner as Sara Heller (season 1), Erik Heller's mother
 Narges Rashidi as Sima (season 1), Dieter's wife

Episodes

Season 1 (2019)

Season 2 (2020)

Season 3 (2021)

Production

Development
On May 23, 2017, it was announced that Amazon had given the production a straight-to-series order. David Farr, who co-wrote the film, was expected to write the series. Executive producers were set to include Marty Adelstein, Becky Clements, Scott Nemes, and JoAnn Alfano. Production companies involved with the series were slated to consist of Tomorrow Studios and NBCUniversal International Studios.

On February 8, 2018, it was announced that the series would be directed by Sarah Adina Smith and that Working Title Television, with executive producers Tim Bevan and Eric Fellner, had joined the production. On April 11, 2019, it was reported that Amazon renewed the series for a second season, which premiered on July 3, 2020. On July 13, 2020, Amazon renewed the series for a third and final season, which premiered on November 24, 2021.

Casting
On February 8, 2018, it was announced that Mireille Enos, Joel Kinnaman, and Esme Creed-Miles had been cast in the series' lead roles. In September 2019, it was reported that Dermot Mulroney, Anthony Welsh, Severine Howell-Meri, Cherelle Skeete, and Gianna Kiehl were joining the cast of Hanna for its second season, with Yasmin Monet Prince and Áine Rose Daly also returning from the first season.

Filming
Principal photography for the series was expected to begin in March 2018 in Hungary, Slovakia, Spain, and the United Kingdom. Filming was also set to take place in Spain at the port of Almeria and the Estación Intermodal.

For the second season, filming took place in the United Kingdom, and in Barcelona and Paris. Filming also took place in the French department Nord, which doubled as the city of Charleroi, Belgium. The second season takes place at the fictional Meadows campus, which was filmed at Bramshill House in Bramshill, UK.

The third season of Hanna began filming in Prague, Czech Republic in February 2021, the first time the series has filmed there. Prague's Karlín district was also used.

Release
The full eight-episode first season of Hanna was released March 29, 2019. On February 3, 2019, coinciding with the broadcast of a teaser for the series during Super Bowl LIII, the first episode was made available on Amazon Video as a time-limited preview for 24 hours.

Reception
On review aggregator Rotten Tomatoes, the first season holds an approval rating of 67% based on 39 reviews, with an average rating of 6.63/10. The website's critical consensus reads, "A gritty reimagining of the 2011 film, Hanna adds new wrinkles to the mythology and texture to the titular assassin — though the series' long-winded journey may try the patience of viewers who want their violent fables concise." On Metacritic, it has a weighted average score of 60 out of 100, based on 19 critics, indicating "mixed or average reviews".

Nick Allen of RogerEbert.com gave the series a negative review, saying that "it's one of the more maddening examples in recent film adapting, and not just because it's so similar to its singular 2011 parent, Joe Wright's Hanna."

The second season holds a Rotten Tomatoes critics score of 93%, based on 15 reviews indicating universal acclaim.

At the 1st Critics' Choice Super Awards, the series received three nominations: Best Action Series and Best Actress in an Action Series (Creed-Miles, Enos).

References

External links

2019 American television series debuts
2021 American television series endings
2010s American drama television series
2020s American drama television series
Amazon Prime Video original programming
American action television series
English-language television shows
Live action television shows based on films
Television series about teenagers
Television series by Amazon Studios
Television series by Universal Television
Television series by Working Title Television
Television shows set in Europe
Television shows set in Poland
Television shows set in the United Kingdom
Television shows set in Spain
Television shows set in Paris
Television shows set in Belgium
Television shows set in Barcelona
Television shows filmed in Spain
Television shows filmed in the United Kingdom
Television shows filmed in France